Chiktong Airport is an airport in Kyerim-ni, Koksan-gun, Hwanghaebuk-to, North Korea.

Facilities 
The airfield has a single grass runway 05/23 measuring 880 x 49 feet (268 x 15 m).

References 

Airports in North Korea
North Hwanghae